The Malakhi Junction, also known as Qastina for the Arab village which once stood there, is a major road junction in Israel, between Highway 40 and 3. It is located on the 37th kilometer of Highway 3.

Like most junctions in Israel, it serves as a major transportation hub and has a trempiada, or hitchhiking stand. Due to its proximity to Kiryat Malakhi, it is also sometimes considered Kiryat Malakhi's central bus station, operated by the Be'er Tuvia Regional Council. In that capacity however, it has been often criticized, to the point that Ynet uses a photo of the bus stations in Qastina as a stock photo for public transportation critiques. In a March 2007 survey, Ynet gave Qastina a 0/10 rating (the lowest) out of 11 bus station checked nationwide. On March 1, 2008, the Israeli Channel 2 ran a similar survey, ranking Qastina lowest, with 0/3 on its three main criteria.

In addition, the junction is a common stop for Israelis traveling between the north/center of the country (Haifa, Tel Aviv) to the south (Beersheba, Eilat), a fact that helps maintain several fast food and other small stores. The junction has a Better Place battery replacement station.

During the October 2000 events, Arab citizens burned tires and threw rocks at passing buses at the junction.

Bus lines

Following is a list of bus lines which stop in the junction's terminal.

1 – stops in the terminal in one direction only
2 – Sundays only

Road accidents
In the beginning of 2010, Ayelet Malko suffered fatal injuries after being run over while crossing the junction. This contributed to a decision to build a pedestrian bridge in the area, which was planned to have been completed by the end of 2010.

Plans
The National Roads Company of Israel approved 500 million NIS to upgrade the junction to an interchange.

See also 
 Transportation in Israel

References

Junctions in Israel
Geography of Southern District (Israel)
Road junctions in Israel